Mullah Abdul Haq Akhund, also spelt Abdul Haq Akhand or Abdulhaq Akhund, is the current Deputy Interior Minister for Counter Narcotics of the Islamic Emirate of Afghanistan since 7 September 2021.

Career 
On 6 September 2021, Akhund met with President of the International Committee of the Red Cross (ICRC) Peter Maurer in Kabul and informed him about the current problems and challenges in Afghanistan in the healthcare sector, to which the ICRC promised its assistance.

On 7 September 2021, Akhund was made Deputy Interior Minister for Counter Narcotics of the Islamic Emirate of Afghanistan.

References 

Living people
Taliban government ministers of Afghanistan
Year of birth missing (living people)